Harold Burston Peel (26 March 1900 – 1976) was an English professional footballer who played in the Football League for Bradford Park Avenue, Arsenal and Bradford City.

References

1900 births
1976 deaths
Footballers from Bradford
Association football inside forwards
English footballers
Bradford (Park Avenue) A.F.C. players
Arsenal F.C. players
Bradford City A.F.C. players
English Football League players